Carmen is a populated place situated in Santa Cruz County, Arizona, United States. Carmen is part of the Tumacacori-Carmen census-designated place.

History
Carmen's population was 60 in the 1960 census.

References

Populated places in Santa Cruz County, Arizona